The Green Banana Hole is a blue hole  off the coast southwest of Sarasota, Florida. Blue holes in this area are thought to have formed as sinkholes on land 8,000 to 12,000 years ago. Due to lower sea levels at this time, the Florida coastline extended approximately  farther into the ocean. The vertical shape of the hole is roughly like an hourglass, making it especially difficult to explore. It is one of the deepest known blue holes.

Etymology 
The name Green Banana was reported to come from the captain of a commercial fishing boat who, while fishing in the area of the hole, saw a green banana skin floating in the water.

Exploration 
In August 2020 the hole was explored by diver Marty Watson and a team of scientists from Florida Atlantic University. In May 2021 scientists from NOAA, Mote Marine Laboratory, and other regional scientific organizations plan to conduct a research expedition to the site where divers and crew using specially designed instruments will explore the hole. Scientists and engineers have built an instrument package called a benthic lander. The lander is a triangular-shaped prism that will be lowered into the hole and will have the expedition's instruments mounted inside. The researchers plan to gather data about the structure of the hole as well as information about seawater chemistry and marine life inside the hole. The team also hopes to gather information about possible connection(s) between the many blue holes that exist off the coast of Florida and the Floridan aquifer system. This expedition is part of a three-year study and builds on the information and experience gathered from an earlier expedition to Amberjack Hole.

See also 
 Marine geology
 Oceanography
 Physical oceanography

References

External links 
 Changing Seas: Episode 1201: Florida's Blue Holes: Oases in the SeaEpisode. PBS
 Exploration of the West Florida Shelf Blue Holes. American Geophysical Union, Fall Meeting 2006.

Cave geology
Landforms of the Gulf of Mexico
Marine geology
.Blue
Sinkholes of Florida
Underwater diving sites in the United States